Devin Halbal (born 1998) is a travel vlogger TikTok star, writer, and community organizer. She is known for her inspirational videos which include witty quips, like the viral "‘Met Gala Behaviour," doll check-in,” and “elevate, activate, appreciate,” mantras, and travel tips. She has written about her experiences as a trans woman in Teen Vogue and Refinery29, amongst other publications. She lives and works in New York.

Early life and education 
Halbal was born and raised in New York. She studied Media and Human Rights while at university. She has interned at the Frick Collection.

Work 
Halbal has worked as a Trans and Gender Nonconforming Outreach Director at LGBT+ centers in New York.

Halbal is openly trans and is a steadfast activist for more authentic trans experiences online and throughout media.

Her favorite fashion designers are Iris van Herpen, Chinese couturier Guo Pei, Emilio Pucci’s prints (“it’s giving me spring and summer vibes 24/7”) and Daniel Roseberry’s Schiaparelli designs.

References 

1998 births
Living people
TikTokers
LGBT people from New York (state)
Transgender rights activists
Transgender-related mass media
21st-century LGBT people